Myelobia dorsipunctellus is a moth in the family Crambidae. It is found in Peru.

References

Chiloini